Ann 'Nancy' O'Driscoll is a former camogie player, captain of the All Ireland Camogie Championship winning team in 1978 and captain of the All Ireland junior winning team of 1973. She made her senior debut in 1974, played in that year's replayed All Ireland final and won a second All Ireland senior medal in 1980. She played field hockey for Ireland and also excelled at badminton.

Career
One of six camogie playing sisters, she won five Cork county championships with Éire Óg and a Munster club championship in 1985 and played for Valley Rovers until 1995 when she appeared in the county Junior B final.

References

Cork camogie players
Living people
Year of birth missing (living people)
Irish female field hockey players